Kunsthochschule Kassel (German; "Kassel College of Art") is a college of fine arts in Kassel, Germany. Founded in 1777, it is a semi-autonomous department of the University of Kassel .

Notable people

 Daniel Stieglitz
 Peter Angermann
 Sinan Akkuş
 Bernhard, Count of Bylandt
 Julius Bien (1826-1909)
 August Bromeis
 Paul Ehrhardt (1888-1981), student 1929-1931
 Bernd Friedmann
 Horst Gläsker
 Ludwig Emil Grimm
 Dörte Helm (1898-1941), student 1915-1918
 Siglinde Kallnbach, attended 1976 - 1983
 Harry Kramer
 Eduard Niczky
 Bjørn Melhus
 Eva Moll
 Amalie Tischbein
 Halsey Rodman
 Hans Sautter (1877–1961), became professor in 1919, director from 1931 to 1933
 Wilhelm Schmidthild
 Curt Witte (1882–1959), professor from 1916 to 1932, director from 1925 to 1931
 Miao Xiaochun

See also 
Collegium Carolinum (Kassel)

References

1777 establishments in the Holy Roman Empire
Buildings and structures in Kassel
Universities and colleges in Hesse
University of Kassel
Educational institutions established in 1777